111 South Wacker Drive is a high-rise office building located in Chicago, Illinois. Completed in 2005 and standing at 681 feet (208 m), the 51 story blue-glass structure is one of the tallest in the city. It sits on the site of the former U.S. Gypsum Building, one of the tallest buildings in Chicago to be demolished.

Designed by Lohan Caprille Goettsch Architects, the building is noted for its unique parking ramp. The ramp's cyclical form creates a dramatic sloped ceiling for the building's main lobby underneath. The ramp's corkscrew design is reflected outside as well; the pavement follows the radiating lines set inside.

The building is also noteworthy for its sustainable design, becoming the first-ever project to be certified LEED-CS Gold by the U.S. Green Building Council.

Original design
The original design called for a more extreme building. This 35 story, 638 foot (194 m) tower would utilize many of the existing caissons of the former U.S. Gypsum Building. The bulk of the building would be supported by a 120-foot (37 m) base and 20 large diagonal braces connected from the corners of the base to the bottom of the office structure. The effect would have been a nearly symmetrical shape and a building that seemingly looked unstable.

The minimalistic lobby would have been enclosed in glass and left space for an exterior plaza with artwork.

The plan was eventually abandoned with the current design chosen instead.

Tenants 
Tenants in the building include Deloitte, RR Donnelley, Harbor Funds, Wells Fargo Capital Finance, Bloomberg, Grippo & Elden LLC, Houlihan Lokey, and Locke Lord LLP.

Shelbourne Development, the firm behind the Chicago Spire, had  of office space on the 50th floor but vacated their offices in 2010 due to a dispute over $27,600 in unpaid rent.

See also
List of skyscrapers
List of tallest buildings in the United States
List of tallest buildings in Chicago
World's tallest structures

References

External links

Emporis listing
Emporis listing for older design
Official Website
Property Magazine International - 111 South Wacker Drive in Chicago receives second LEED gold certification

Skyscraper office buildings in Chicago
Office buildings completed in 2005
Leadership in Energy and Environmental Design gold certified buildings
2005 establishments in Illinois